The  is a Japanese international school in Sant Cugat del Vallès, Catalonia, Spain, in Greater Barcelona. Many Japanese families live along the school's bus route in northern Barcelona.

The  (バルセロナ補習校 Baruserona Hoshūkō), a weekend supplementary Japanese school, holds its classes in the Colegio Japonés de Barcelona building.

Curriculum
The school uses Japanese as its language of instruction. Foreign language instruction is two hours per week and consists of the Spanish and English languages. , a professor at the Autonomous University of Barcelona and the author of Els usos lingüístics dels nens japonesos i nipocatalans/nipocastellans escolaritzats a Catalunya: el cas de l’alumnat de l’escola complementària de llengua japonesa i del col·legi japonès de Barcelona, stated that many students do not get sufficient progress in their foreign language instruction because they primarily have relations with other Japanese, have little motivation to learn the area language since they understand they will only be temporarily in Barcelona, and because of the low hours per week of foreign language instruction. Most CJB students have trivial amounts of Catalan language instruction for festivals and other symbolic reasons. Some of the part-Japanese students take a special Catalan class.

Student body
As of 2012 there were 60 students at the school. As of 2009 most students are children of temporary Japanese workers. Norio Sudo, the consul general of Japan in Barcelona, stated that these parents are managers of Japanese companies. Some students are part-Japanese. The students range in age from 5 years to 15 years.

See also

 Japan–Spain relations
 Japanese people in Spain
 Colegio Japonés de Madrid

References
 Fukuda, Makiko (University of Barcelona). "Els usos lingüístics dels nens japonesos i nipocatalans/nipocastellans escolaritzats a Catalunya: el cas de l’alumnat de l’escola complementària de llengua japonesa i del col·legi japonès de Barcelona." In: Ibba, Daniela (editor).  Interlingüística XIX: La Lingüística y los jóvenes investigadores / La Lingüística i els joves historiadors / Linguistics and Young Researchers. 2009. p. 707-716. . DL: C-154-1997. Standalone paper version cited: p. 1-10. English abstract available.

Notes

Further reading
 Fukuda, Makiko. "El Col·legi Japonès de Barcelona: un estudi pilot sobre les ideologies lingüístiques d'una comunitat expatriada a Catalunya" (Archive). Treballs de sociolingüística catalana > 2005: 18 (2004). See profile at Revistes Catalanes amb Accés Obert (RACO).
 Kojima, Keita. /EMRO Spain/ - "Japanese School in Barcelona as an example of ecological education", presented at the 38th International Microbiological Symposium
 権藤 信慶 (前バルセロナ日本人学校:福岡県中間市立中間中学校). "バルセロナ日本人学校での実践をとおして(国際理解教育・現地理解教育)." 在外教育施設における指導実践記録 33, 122-125, 2010-12-24. Tokyo Gakugei University. See profile at CiNii.

External links

 Japanese School in Barcelona 
 Hoshuko Barcelona Educación Japonesa 

Schools in the Province of Barcelona
Sant Cugat del Vallès
International schools in Catalonia
Barcelona
Private schools in Spain
Barcelona